In mathematics, an isometry (or congruence, or congruent transformation) is a distance-preserving transformation between metric spaces, usually assumed to be bijective. The word isometry is derived from the Ancient Greek: ἴσος isos meaning "equal", and μέτρον metron meaning "measure".

Introduction 

Given a metric space (loosely, a set and a scheme for assigning distances between elements of the set), an isometry is a transformation which maps elements to the same or another metric space such that the distance between the image elements in the new metric space is equal to the distance between the elements in the original metric space. 
In a two-dimensional or three-dimensional Euclidean space, two geometric figures are congruent if they are related by an isometry;
the isometry that relates them is either a rigid motion (translation or rotation), or a composition of a rigid motion and a reflection.

Isometries are often used in constructions where one space is embedded in another space. For instance, the completion of a metric space  involves an isometry from  into  a quotient set of the space of Cauchy sequences on  
The original space  is thus isometrically isomorphic to a subspace of a complete metric space, and it is usually identified with this subspace. 
Other embedding constructions show that every metric space is isometrically isomorphic to a closed subset of some normed vector space and that every complete metric space is isometrically isomorphic to a closed subset of some Banach space.

An isometric surjective linear operator on a Hilbert space is called a unitary operator.

Definition 

Let   and  be metric spaces with metrics (e.g., distances)  and  
A map is called an isometry or distance preserving if for any one has

An isometry is automatically injective; otherwise two distinct points, a and b, could be mapped to the same point, thereby contradicting the coincidence axiom of the metric d. 
This proof is similar to the proof that an order embedding between partially ordered sets is injective. Clearly, every isometry between metric spaces is a topological embedding.

A global isometry, isometric isomorphism or congruence mapping is a bijective isometry. Like any other bijection, a global isometry has a function inverse. 
The inverse of a global isometry is also a global isometry.

Two metric spaces X and Y are called isometric if there is a bijective isometry from X to Y. 
The set of bijective isometries from a metric space to itself forms a group with respect to function composition, called the isometry group.

There is also the weaker notion of path isometry or arcwise isometry:

A path isometry or arcwise isometry is a map which preserves the lengths of curves; such a map is not necessarily an isometry in the distance preserving sense, and it need not necessarily be bijective, or even injective. 
This term is often abridged to simply isometry, so one should take care to determine from context which type is intended.

Examples
 Any reflection, translation and rotation is a global isometry on Euclidean spaces.
Note that unlike an isometry, this path isometry does not need to be injective.

Isometries between normed spaces 

The following theorem is due to Mazur and Ulam. 

Linear isometry 

Given two normed vector spaces  and  a linear isometry is a linear map  that preserves the norms:

for all  
Linear isometries are distance-preserving maps in the above sense. 
They are global isometries if and only if they are surjective.

In an inner product space, the above definition reduces to 

for all  which is equivalent to saying that  This also implies that isometries preserve inner products, as

Linear isometries are not always unitary operators, though, as those require additionally that  and 

Examples

Manifold 

An isometry of a manifold is any (smooth) mapping of that manifold into itself, or into another manifold that preserves the notion of distance between points. 
The definition of an isometry requires the notion of a metric on the manifold; a manifold with a (positive-definite) metric is a Riemannian manifold, one with an indefinite metric is a pseudo-Riemannian manifold. Thus, isometries are studied in Riemannian geometry.

A local isometry from one (pseudo-)Riemannian manifold to another is a map which pulls back the metric tensor on the second manifold to the metric tensor on the first. When such a map is also a diffeomorphism, such a map is called an isometry (or isometric isomorphism), and provides a notion of isomorphism ("sameness") in the category Rm of Riemannian manifolds.

Definition 

Let  and  be two (pseudo-)Riemannian manifolds, and let  be a diffeomorphism. Then  is called an isometry (or isometric isomorphism) if

where  denotes the pullback of the rank (0, 2) metric tensor  by  

If  is a local diffeomorphism such that  then  is called a local isometry.

Properties
A collection of isometries typically form a group, the isometry group. When the group is a continuous group, the infinitesimal generators of the group are the Killing vector fields. 

The Myers–Steenrod theorem states that every isometry between two connected Riemannian manifolds is smooth (differentiable). A second form of this theorem states that the isometry group of a Riemannian manifold is a Lie group.

Riemannian manifolds that have isometries defined at every point are called symmetric spaces.

Generalizations
 Given a positive real number ε, an ε-isometry or almost isometry (also called a Hausdorff approximation) is a map  between metric spaces such that
 for  one has  and
 for any point  there exists a point  with 

Note that -isometries are not assumed to be continuous.

 The restricted isometry property characterizes nearly isometric matrices for sparse vectors.
 Quasi-isometry is yet another useful generalization.
 One may also define an element in an abstract unital C*-algebra to be an isometry: 
 is an isometry if and only if  
Note that as mentioned in the introduction this is not necessarily a unitary element because one does not in general have that left inverse is a right inverse.

 On a pseudo-Euclidean space, the term isometry means a linear bijection preserving magnitude. See also Quadratic spaces.

See also 

 Beckman–Quarles theorem
 
 The second dual of a Banach space as an isometric isomorphism
 Euclidean plane isometry
 Flat (geometry)
 Homeomorphism group
 Involution
 Isometry group
 Motion (geometry)
 Myers–Steenrod theorem
 3D isometries that leave the origin fixed
 Partial isometry
 Scaling (geometry)
 Semidefinite embedding
 Space group
 Symmetry in mathematics

Footnotes

References

Bibliography

  
  
  
   
 
 
 

Functions and mappings
Metric geometry
Symmetry
Equivalence (mathematics)
Riemannian geometry